Alycia Jasmin Debnam-Carey (born 20 July 1993) is an Australian actress. She is best known for her portrayals of the characters Lexa on the dystopian science fiction series The 100 (2014–2016; 2020) and Alicia Clark on the horror drama series Fear the Walking Dead (2015–2022). She made her film debut in 2003 in Rachel Ward's Australian short drama Martha's New Coat, and her feature film debut in the American disaster film Into the Storm (2014). In 2022, she made her directorial debut with the episode "Ofelia" on the seventh season of Fear the Walking Dead.

Early life
Debnam-Carey was born on 20 July 1993, in Sydney, New South Wales, Australia. Her mother, Leone Carey, worked as a children's television writer, and her father was a musician. As children, Debnam-Carey and her brother would help their mother act out the program segments she wrote. Debnam-Carey began acting at age eight, and also studied classical percussion for ten years. She attended Newtown High School of the Performing Arts, where she was a percussionist. In 2010, in partnership with the Berlin Philharmonic, Debnam-Carey and around 40 other musicians composed a piece in a two-week program and performed it at the Sydney Opera House. In her last year of school, she was listed as a distinguished achiever by the NSW Government for achieving the top band of six Higher School Certificate courses, including English Advanced, English Extension 1, Drama, Modern History, Music 2 and Visual Arts. She received the Premier's Award for earning a score of 90+ in over 10 units, as well as an OnStage nomination for achievement in drama and an HSC Encore nomination for achievement in music. Graduating from Newtown in 2011, she almost attended the Sydney Conservatorium of Music, but decided she wanted to pursue acting.

Career

2003–2013: Career beginnings
Debnam-Carey made her film debut at age ten in Rachel Ward's award-winning short-feature film Martha's New Coat (2003). In 2006, she guest-starred in the Australian drama series McLeod's Daughters, and voiced Lee in the Australian animated short film, The Safe House, based on the Petrov Affair. In 2008, she appeared in television film Dream Life and the short drama film Jigsaw Girl. Debnam-Carey also played supporting roles in the short films At the Tattooist (2010) and The Branch (2011). In 2010, she was cast in the unsold pilot Resistance, and guest-starred in an episode of the Australian drama series, Dance Academy.

In her last year of high school, Debnam-Carey decided on traveling to the U.S. after graduating to pursue acting. She began to work in Hollywood at the age of 18. She appeared in Next Stop Hollywood (2013), a six-part documentary that followed six Australian actors as they competed for roles during the U.S. TV pilot season. After two weeks in Los Angeles, Debnam-Carey auditioned for the role of a young Carrie Bradshaw for the CW series The Carrie Diaries, and was asked to audition for an independent thriller film set in the Amish community. She landed on the shortlist for The Carrie Diaries and tested for the network, but the network said she looked too young for the role. She was offered the lead role in the thriller film, later titled The Devil's Hand, which she began filming in North Carolina during the final week of the documentary. While staying in LA, Debnam-Carey became a Heath Ledger Scholarship Finalist in November 2012.

2014–2022: The 100 and Fear the Walking Dead

In 2014, Debnam-Carey played a supporting role in the American disaster film Into the Storm. Following The Devil's Hand, she was cast in a series pilot called Galyntine for AMC, starring Peter Fonda and co-executive-produced by Ridley Scott, Greg Nicotero and Jason Cahill, though AMC ultimately opted not to take the pilot to series. 

Debnam-Carey guest-starred in the second season of The CW's dystopian series The 100, debuting in episode six (aired 3 December 2014) as Lexa. Lexa soon became a fan favorite, and Debnam-Carey's breakout role. On 1 December 2014, the four lead roles of AMC's Fear the Walking Dead were announced, with Debnam-Carey as Alicia Clark. At San Diego Comic-Con International in July 2015, The 100s showrunner Jason Rothenberg announced that Debnam-Carey would be returning to the show's third season. AMC had agreed to two blocks of filming schedules for her to film for both shows.

Fear the Walking Dead premiered on 23 August 2015. On 27 August, Debnam-Carey made her first talk show appearance on Jimmy Kimmel Live! while promoting the series. In December, The Wrap featured Debnam-Carey as one of the 15 breakout TV stars of 2015 for The 100 and Fear the Walking Dead. In 2016, she won the MTV Fandom Award for Fan Freakout of the Year for Lexa on The 100, and E! Online TV Scoop Awards for Best Guest Star (as Lexa) and Female Breakout Star (for Lexa and Alicia Clark). 

Debnam-Carey received critical acclaim for her portrayal of Lexa on The 100. Considered a breakout star of Fear the Walking Dead as well, she also received critical praise for her work in the series, with Erik Kain of Forbes writing, "Debnam-Carey is a fantastic actor. She was great in The 100 but she's even better in Fear", crediting her performance in the third season episode "This Land is Your Land" for "elevating the show". Vanity Fair Laura Bradley said Debnam-Carey "delivered one of her best performances yet" in the season four episode "Close Your Eyes", and David Zapanta of Den of Geek deemed it "arguably a career-defining performance".

Debnam-Carey appeared in the lead role of Laura in the German thriller Friend Request, released in Germany on 7 January 2016. In October 2017, she was cast in the crime drama A Violent Separation (2019) as Frances Campbell, younger sister of the victim. In 2017 and 2018, she was nominated for the Saturn Awards for Best Performance by a Younger Actor in a Television Series for her work in Fear the Walking Dead. In 2020, she made an appearance in the series finale of The 100, portraying a being known as a judge who assumed Lexa's form to communicate.

In July 2021, it was announced that Debnam-Carey would make her directorial debut in 2022 for a season seven episode of Fear the Walking Dead. She directed the eleventh episode of the season, "Ofelia". Debnam-Carey said she had always been interested in directing ever since she took a film class in school, where she made a short film. In May 2022, she announced that the seventh season episode "Amina" was her final on the series.

2022–present: Upcoming projects
Debnam-Carey will portray Alice Hart in The Lost Flowers of Alice Hart, co-starring with Sigourney Weaver in the seven-episode Amazon original series based on Holly Ringland's best-selling novel. She will also star as Emily in the eight-part Hulu series Saint X, a psychological drama told through multiple timelines and perspectives, based on Alexis Schaitkin's novel of the same name. Debnam-Carey is reported to appear in the independent sci-thriller film It's What's Inside, co-produced by former Fear the Walking Dead co-star Colman Domingo and written and directed by Greg Jardin.

Filmography

Film

Television

Awards and nominations

References

External links

 
 

1993 births
21st-century Australian actresses
Actresses from Sydney
Australian child actresses
Australian expatriate actresses in the United States
Motion capture actresses
Australian video game actresses
Australian voice actresses
Australian film actresses
Australian television actresses
Living people